The Lower Mississippi water resource region is one of 21 major geographic areas, or regions, in the first level of classification used by the United States Geological Survey to divide and sub-divide the United States into successively smaller hydrologic units. These geographic areas contain either the drainage area of a major river, or the combined drainage areas of a series of rivers.

This region includes the drainage within the United States of: (a) the Mississippi River below its confluence with the Ohio River, excluding the Arkansas, Red, and White River basins above the points of highest backwater effect of the Mississippi River in those basins; and (b) coastal streams that ultimately discharge into the Gulf of Mexico from the Pearl River Basin boundary to the Sabine River and Sabine Lake drainage boundary. Includes parts of Arkansas, Kentucky, Louisiana, Mississippi, Missouri, and Tennessee.

List of water resource subregions

See also
List of rivers in the United States
Water resource region

References

 
Lists of drainage basins
Drainage basins
Watersheds of the United States
Regions of the United States
 Resource
Water resource regions